HMAS LST 3014 was a landing ship tank which was briefly operated by the Royal Navy and Royal Australian Navy (RAN). She was built at Barclay Curle in the United Kingdom during World War II and was launched on 11 November 1944. She served with the Royal Navy as HMS LST 3014 until 1 July 1946 when she was transferred to the RAN. In RAN service she was used to dump ammunition at sea. HMAS LST 3014 was sold for scrap on 4 June 1950.

References
 
 

 

1944 ships
LST (3)-class tank landing ships of the Royal Australian Navy